Gilbert Doucet (25 March 1956 – 7 July 2020) was a French rugby union player and coach.

Awards
Finalist in the 1984–85 French Rugby Union Championship

References

1956 births
2020 deaths
French rugby union players
Rugby union flankers